This is a list of Philippine Basketball Association players by total career blocks.

Statistics accurate as of December 22, 2022.

See also
List of Philippine Basketball Association players

References

External links
Philippine Basketball Association All-time Most Blockshots Leaders – PBA Online.net

Blocks, Career